Markarian 231 (UGC 8058) is a Type-1 Seyfert galaxy that was discovered in 1969 as part of a search of galaxies with strong ultraviolet radiation. It contains the nearest known quasar. Markarian 231 is located about 581 million light years away from Earth, in the constellation of Ursa Major.

Characteristics
The Markarian 231 galaxy is undergoing an energetic starburst. A nuclear ring of active star formation has been found in the center with a rate of formation greater than 100 solar masses per year. It is one of the most ultraluminous infrared galaxies with power derived from an accreting black hole in the center and the closest known quasar.

A study in 2015 suggested that the central black hole, estimated to be 150 million times the mass of the Sun, may have a black hole companion weighing in at 4 million solar masses, and that the duo completed an orbit around each other every 1.2 years. However, that model has subsequently been shown to be unfeasible.

Another study has found evidence for the presence of molecular oxygen (O2) by using submillimetre astronomy, the first time molecular oxygen had been detected outside of the Milky Way galaxy.

See also
List of galaxies

References

External links
Markarian 231 at ESA
SpaceRef  Feb 23, 2011  Quasar's Belch Solves Longstanding Mystery, from Gemini North Observatory, ApJ March 2011, to be published.
 Chang-Shuo Yan, Youjun Lu, Xinyu Dai, and Qingjuan Yu. "A probable milli-parsec supermassive binary black hole in the nearest quasar MRK 231" 2015 August 14 The Astrophysical Journal, Vol. 809, Iss. 2 
http://www.cnn.com/2015/08/31/us/double-black-hole-nasa-hubble-feat/
http://www.sci-news.com/astronomy/science-supermassive-binary-black-hole-markarian231-03180.html
http://dso-browser.com/dso/info/UGC/8058

Spiral galaxies
Seyfert galaxies
Luminous infrared galaxies
8058
Markarian galaxies
44117
Ursa Major (constellation)